Ravi S. Naik (born 18 September 1946) is a former chief minister and Bharatiya Janata Party politician in Goa, India. He started his career on the Maharashtrawadi Gomantak Party.

Early life
He was born on 18 September 1946 in Ponda, Goa. His father is Sitaram Naik.

His biodata lists him as an "agriculturist, political and social worker", and his home is in the central Goa sub-district of Ponda. His "favourite pastime and recreation" activities are listed as gardening, music, reading and watching TV, while his "special interest" is listed as social service.

Ravi Naik has been the lone legislator in Goa  who was a national volleyball player. He has been chief minister for just a six-day stint in 1994 (when he was controversially appointed by the then Governor). He plays badminton, and according to the Times of India he "began his career by owning a bar and restaurant in Ponda".

Political role

Stint as Chief Minister

Naik contested his first elections in 1980 on a Maharashtrawadi Gomantak Party ticket, but lost. After quitting that party in 1991, he became the state's chief minister then and again in 1994.

He has been a member of the Goa Legislative Assembly since 1984, but not continuously. In 1990, he was part of the team which topped the then ruling Congress party, leading to intercine political instability that dominated much of that decade and more.

Besides chairing committees in the Goa Assembly, he has also been a cabinet minister at the regional (Goa) level holding—at different times—the portfolios of Agriculture, Animal Husbandry and Veterinary Services, Information & Publicity, Home, Town & Country Planning, Personnel, General Administration, Vigilance, Finance, PWD, Housing, Science and Technology and Printing & Stationery.

Naik lost the 2012 elections to Lavoo Mamledar of the Maharashtrawadi Gomantak Party.

According to the official website of the Goa Assembly, he won the 2007 elections on an Indian National Congress ticket from the Ponda constituency, where a total of 24557 votes were polled. Naik received 9972 votes, and won by a margin of 1656 votes. He also won the 2002 Assembly elections (Ponda, 1320 votes margin), and the 1989 elections (Madkai, 1651 votes margin).

Ravi Naik was elected again to the Goa Assembly in the state election of 2017, this time with a margin of 3000 votes. He is a member of five member Congress Legislative Party (CLP) of Goa and remained with the party during the two-thirds split in the CLP in 2019 where 10 MLAs defected to the ruling BJP.

National Parliament, Goa opposition, Deputy Chief Minister

In 1998, after a loss in local politics, he was elected to the national Indian parliament. In 1999, he took over as Leader of the Goa Opposition, and between 2000 and 2002 he was Deputy Chief Minister in the then Bharatiya Janata Party government in Goa. "I have not been in elections from yesterday or today. I've been in politics since 1967... and we were against the merger (of Goa into Maharashtra)," Naik said (in Konkani) in the Prudent TV interview below.

His son Roy Naik has also been involved in local politics.

Controversies

In an interview with Prudent TV (see link below), he defended his handling of the police in Goa, which had come in for sharp criticism during his tenure at their helm as Home Minister.

His ascent to power for his first tenure in 1990-91 was questioned in a Supreme Court of India case (see link below) over his assumption to power with Indian National Congress support, apparently because of the disqualification he was facing.

The then opposition BJP made allegations against Naik and his son Roy Naik of involvement with the coastal illegal narcotic trade. Opposition politicians and a section of the media highlighted charges by Swedish model Lucky Farmhouse which suggested the Naik or his kin were someway connected with the narcotics controversy.

See also
 List of Bhandaris

References

External links
Goa Legislative Assembly official website, page of Ravi S. Naik
Ravi S. Naik vs Union Of India on 9 February 1994 -- Supreme Court of India
Ravi S. Naik, biodata
Ravi S. Naik, election interview 2012 with goasamachardotcom, in Hindi
Prudent TV interview with Ravi S. Naik, in Konkani

Former members of Indian National Congress from Goa
Chief Ministers of Goa
United Progressive Alliance candidates in the 2014 Indian general election
Deputy chief ministers of Goa
1947 births
Living people
Chief ministers from Indian National Congress
People from North Goa district
Maharashtrawadi Gomantak Party politicians
Goa MLAs 2017–2022
Lok Sabha members from Goa
India MPs 1998–1999
Bharatiya Janata Party politicians from Goa
Goa MLAs 1984–1989
Goa MLAs 1989–1994
Goa MLAs 1999–2002
Goa MLAs 2022–2027